Shei-Pa National Park is a national park located in the central part of Taiwan around the peaks of Hsuehshan and Dabajian Mountain, with an area of  , covering the area of Hsinchu County, Miaoli County and Taichung City. High mountain ecology, geology, topography, rivers, creek valleys, rare animals and plants, and plentiful variety of forest types are some important resources for conservation.

The park's headquarters was set up on 1 July 1992. The current headquarters director is Lin Ching (林青). The address of Shei-Pa National Park is 100 Xueweiping, Fuxing Village, Dahu Township, Miaoli County, Taiwan.

Geography, Climate and Geology
Shei-Pa National Park is located some 100 km north of the Tropic of Cancer. The park covers a wide range of ecosystems between 760 meters at the lowest point, the Da-an River Valley (大安溪) and 3,886 meters elevation at the highest point, the top of Xueshan (雪山主峰). Xueshan is the second tallest mountain in Taiwan.  The Xueshan Range is located along the northern end of Taiwan's Central Range. Like most of the mountains of Taiwan, the Xueshan Range mountains are an uplifted metamorphic belt that makes up the spine of the country. Notable geologic features of the park include the box fold of Pintian Mountain as well as many glacial cirques.

The mountains of Shei-Pa cradle the headwaters of several major rivers in Taiwan. The park receives between 1,500 mm and 3,000 mm of rainfall a year and is an important water resource for the country: Takejin Creek flows north to join the Danshui River, which provides water for Taipei. The Dajia River and the Da-an River flow west and north west to provide water to Taichung County. The Touqian River flows northwest to Hsinchu County.

Asteroid 278956 Shei-Pa was named after the national park. The official  was published by the Minor Planet Center on 25 September 2018.

Flora
In 2022 a team of researchers measured a 79.1 meters (259.5 feet) Taiwania specimen in the Park. The tree was growing at an elevation of 2,000m.

See also
 List of national parks in Taiwan

References

National parks of Taiwan
Protected areas established in 1992
Geography of Miaoli County
Tourist attractions in Miaoli County
Geography of Taichung
Tourist attractions in Taichung
Geography of Hsinchu County
Tourist attractions in Hsinchu County